Mohabbat Ke Dushman is a 1988 Indian Hindi-language action film produced and directed by Prakash Mehra. It stars Raaj Kumar, Hema Malini, Sanjay Dutt and Farah in lead roles.

Cast
 Raaj Kumar as Rehmat Khan
 Hema Malini as Shamajaan
 Sanjay Dutt as Hashim
 Farah as Reshma
 Amrish Puri as Shahbaaz Khan
 Pran as Rustam
 Om Prakash as Pandit
 Suresh Oberoi as Abu Bhai
 Dina Pathak as Ammijaan
 Manjeet Kular as Raabiya

Plot
Circa 18th century India, the beauty of Shamajaan is widely known all over the region. This gets the interest of notorious Shahbaaz Khan, who decides to make her one more wife in his harem. He goes to her residence to woo her, but she indicates her unwillingness. Shahbaaz abducts her, killing her dad in the process, and takes him to his palace. Shamajaan manages to escape, and ends up at the palace of Ahmed Khan, where she is received and treated with respect, and is assured that Shahbaaz will not dare to attack anyone in the protection of Ahmed. Frustrated, Shahbaaz circulates that Shamajaan is one of his concubines, and when word of this gets to Ahmed's palace, the family has no choice except to turn Shamajaan out, and again at the mercy of Shahbaaz Khan.

Soundtrack

References

External links

1980s Hindi-language films
1988 films
Films directed by Prakash Mehra
Films scored by Kalyanji Anandji
Indian action drama films